The 2015 Western Kentucky Hilltoppers football team represented Western Kentucky University (WKU) in the 2015 NCAA Division I FBS football season as members of the East Division of Conference USA. Led by second year head coach Jeff Brohm, they played their home games at Houchens Industries–L. T. Smith Stadium in Bowling Green, Kentucky. They finished the season 12–2, 8–0 in C-USA play to be champions of the East Division. They represented the East Division in the Conference USA Football Championship Game where they defeated Southern Miss to win their first ever C-USA championship. They were invited to the Miami Beach Bowl where they defeated South Florida. They led the NCAA in Passing Efficiency, tied the school record for victories and were also ranked in the FBS AP Top 25 for the first time in program history.

Previous season
The Hilltoppers finished the 2014 season 8–5 overall and 4–4 in conference play. WKU biggest win and upset was against season closer Marshall by 67–66 in overtime, Marshall's first and only loss of their season making them ineligible for a berth in a New Year's Six Bowl. WKU became bowl eligible after defeating UTSA and was invited to play in the inaugural Bahamas Bowl, the first international bowl game since 2010. The Hilltoppers defeated the Central Michigan Chippewas, 49–48.

Schedule
Western Kentucky announced their 2015 football schedule on February 2, 2015. The 2015 schedule consist of five home and seven away games in the regular season. The Hilltoppers will host CUSA foes Florida Atlantic, Louisiana Tech, Marshall, and Middle Tennessee, and will travel to Florida International (FIU), North Texas, Old Dominion, and Rice.

Schedule source:

Rankings

Game summaries

at Vanderbilt

Louisiana Tech

at Indiana

Miami (OH)

at Rice

Middle Tennessee

at North Texas

at LSU

at Old Dominion

Florida Atlantic

at Florida International

Marshall

Southern Miss (C–USA Championship Game)

South Florida (Miami Beach Bowl)

References

Western Kentucky
Western Kentucky Hilltoppers football seasons
Conference USA football champion seasons
Miami Beach Bowl champion seasons
Western Kentucky Hilltoppers football